3962 Valyaev is a dark Themistian asteroid from the outer region of the asteroid belt. It was discovered on 8 February 1967, by Russian astronomer Tamara Smirnova at Nauchnyj on the Crimean peninsula, and later named after Russian astronomer Valerij Valyaev.

Classification and orbit 

The C-type asteroid is a member of the Themis family, a dynamical family of outer-belt asteroids with nearly coplanar ecliptical orbits. It orbits the Sun at a distance of 2.8–3.6 AU once every 5 years and 9 months (2,100 days). Its orbit has an eccentricity of 0.11 and an inclination of 2° with respect to the ecliptic. A first precovery was obtained at Palomar Observatory in 1956, extending the asteroid's observation arc by 11 years prior to its discovery.

Naming 

This minor planet was named after Russian astronomer Valerij Valyaev (b. 1944), chief of the Ephemeris Astronomy Department at the Institute for Theoretical Astronomy (ITA), which was then part of the USSR Academy of Sciences in Leningrad. The minor planet 1735 ITA is named after this institute. Valyaev is also the senior editor of the periodicals Morskoj Astronomicheskij Ezhegodnik and Aviatsionnyj Astronomicheskij Ezhegodnik. The asteroids's name was proposed by ITA, and its  was published by the Minor Planet Center on 18 December 1994 .

Physical characteristics

Rotation period 

In September 2010, a rotational lightcurve of Valyaev was obtained from photometric observations by the Palomar Transient Factory survey in California. Lightcurve analysis gave a rotation period of  hours with a brightness amplitude of 0.44 magnitude.

Diameter and albedo 

According to the surveys carried out by the Japanese Akari satellite and the NEOWISE mission of NASA's Wide-field Infrared Survey Explorer, Valyaev measures 14.76 and 16.3 kilometers in diameter and its surface has a low albedo of 0.088 and 0.089, respectively. The Collaborative Asteroid Lightcurve Link (CALL) assumes an albedo for carbonaceous asteroids of 0.08 and calculates a smaller diameter of 12.6 kilometers with an absolute magnitude of 12.85.

References

External links 
 Lightcurve Database Query (LCDB), at www.minorplanet.info
 Dictionary of Minor Planet Names, Google books
 Asteroids and comets rotation curves, CdR – Geneva Observatory, Raoul Behrend
 Discovery Circumstances: Numbered Minor Planets (1)-(5000) – Minor Planet Center
 
 

003962
Discoveries by Tamara Mikhaylovna Smirnova
Named minor planets
19670208